Mark Caltonhill is a British translator and writer. He is the author of "Private Prayers and Public Parades - Exploring the Religious Life of Taipei".

Career
Caltonhill, who studied first botany and later Chinese, both at the University of Edinburgh, is a writer and performer, currently based in Taiwan, R.O.C.

Caltonhill is a frequent contributor to Taiwan's English-language newspapers (Taipei Times, Taiwan News, China Post), for the last he has been both a columnist, writing under the byline Jonathan Wardle a weekly column "View from the Hill" covering various cultural topics, and an unnamed leader writer, covering politics and current affairs.
He also writes for magazines such as Amcham's "Topics", Taipei City Government's "Discover Taipei", Tourism Bureau's "Travel In Taiwan" and various Government Information Office publications. 
His English-language book "Private Prayers and Public Parades - Exploring the Religious Life of Taipei" was published in 2002 by the Department of Information, Taipei City Government. Subsequent publications cover museums and tourism, and a collection of poems and short fiction (see bibliography).

Caltonhill earlier worked as a comedian/juggler in Europe and Taiwan, appearing in Leofoo and other theme parks and on television. Since 2010 he has resumed his performance career, presenting stand up and comedy poetry, and most recently comedy songs. As a performer he is known as Mark Malarkey (English-language shows) and Hushuo Make (胡說馬克) (Chinese-language shows).

Bibliography 
Private Prayers and Public Parades - Exploring the Religious Life of Taipei 
Taipei Taipei Epiphanies : Exploring Taipei's Museums and Their Surrounding Cultural Hotspots, 2006, Co-writer
Malarkey's Amusement Park, 2008, Jiyue Publications, (poems and short fiction)
 Michelin Green Guide—Taiwan, 2011, Co-writer

References 
 Taipei Times - Taiwan's religious past in the present

British translators
Living people
Year of birth missing (living people)